Salome Jens (born May 8, 1935) is an American dancer and actress of stage, film and television. She is perhaps best known for portraying the Female Changeling on Star Trek: Deep Space Nine (19941999).

Early years
Jens was born in Milwaukee, Wisconsin to Salomea (née Szujewski) and Arnold John Jens, a farmer and builder. In July 1969, she remarked that "the only time I can imagine contemplating suicide would be if I was told that I had to go back and live in Milwaukee forever" a comment for which she later apologized.

Jens majored in drama at Northwestern University, and she became a dance student of Martha Graham. In New York, she studied acting at HB Studio.

Career

Jens appeared in the role of the thief in the New York premiere production of Jean Genet's The Balcony. She earned excellent reviews playing Josie in A Moon for the Misbegotten at New York's Circle in the Square Theatre in the late 1960s, and she appeared in Antony and Cleopatra with the American Shakespeare Theatre company in 1972.

Jens first appeared on film in Terror from the Year 5000 (1958), which was later featured in the eighth season of Mystery Science Theater 3000. Her other notable film roles occurred in Angel Baby (1961), The Fool Killer (1965), Seconds (1966), Me, Natalie (1969), Savages (1972), The Boy Who Talked to Badgers (1975), Diary of the Dead (1976), Cloud Dancer (1980), Harry's War (1981) and Just Between Friends (1986).

Jens appeared in the April 7, 1962 episode of The Defenders as a stripper. In 1963, she appeared in The Untouchables and The Outer Limits. Other guest roles in the 1960s included those on The Rat Patrol and I Spy episode. In 1967, she joined the cast of the soap opera Love Is a Many Splendored Thing, playing the role of Audrey Hurley for 500 episodes until 1973.

During the 1970s, Jens appeared in episodes of television shows such as Bonanza, Gunsmoke, McMillan and Wife, The New Land, Gibbsville and Medical Center. In 1976–77, Jens played the role of Mae Olinski on 43 episodes of the soap spoof Mary Hartman, Mary Hartman.

In the 1980s, Jens appeared in episodes of shows including The Colbys, Cagney & Lacey, MacGyver, Falcon Crest, The Hogan Family and The Wonder Years. She played Clark Kent's mother Martha Kent in several episodes of the TV series Superboy (1988-92), and in 1992-93, she appeared in a three-episode arc of the seventh season of L.A. Law. She appeared as Joan Campbell in several episodes of Melrose Place in Season 1 (1992-93) and again later in an episode of Season 6 (1997).

Jens appeared in the 1993 episode of Star Trek: The Next Generation titled "The Chase" as a member of the race responsible for populating the galaxy with humanoid life forms. She appeared in a recurring role spanning five seasons of Star Trek: Deep Space 9 as the totalitarian Female Changeling (1994-99).

Jens narrated a number of documentaries including The Great War and the Shaping of the 20th Century and voiced the female Guardian in the Green Lantern (2011). In 2018, Jens lent her voice to the video game Star Trek Online, reprising her role as the Female Changeling.

Awards
Back Stage West Garland Awards, 2007 award for her role in the play Leipzig

Filmography

Film

Television

References

External links

 Salome Jens at the University of Wisconsin's Actors Studio audio collection
 
 
 
 

1935 births
Actresses from Milwaukee
American film actresses
American stage actresses
American television actresses
Back Stage West Garland Award recipients
Living people
20th-century American actresses
21st-century American women